The Ozark Courthouse Square Historic District  is a national historic district located at Ozark, Christian County, Missouri. It encompasses 19 contributing buildings in a  area in the central business district of Ozark.
The central feature of the district, the Christian County Courthouse, is a three-story, Classical Revival style brick building designed by architect Henry H. Hohenschild. Other notable buildings include the Bank of Ozark/Masonic Lodge (1897), First Baptist Church (1919), Methodist Episcopal Church (1914), Robertson Brothers’ Store (1882), Ozark Drug (1905), Works Progress Administration Community Building (1934), Hospital (c. 1945), and Christian County Bank (c. 1886, 1910 façade).

It was listed on the National Register of Historic Places in 2009.

References

Works Progress Administration in Missouri
Historic districts on the National Register of Historic Places in Missouri
Courthouses on the National Register of Historic Places in Missouri
Neoclassical architecture in Missouri
National Register of Historic Places in Christian County, Missouri
Buildings and structures in Christian County, Missouri